However is an adverb in the English language.

It may also refer to:
 "However Do You Want Me", a 1989 song by British R&B band Soul II Soul
 "However", a 1997 song by Japanese band Glay
 "However Much I Booze", a 1975 song by The Who
 "However Much Love", a 2018 song by Filipina singer Nina
 However U Want It, an album by Emcee N.I.C.E.
 However symbol, name of a Gothic letter